The 1973 North Carolina Tar Heels football team represented the University of North Carolina at Chapel Hill during the 1973 NCAA Division I football season. The Tar Heels were led by seventh-year head coach Bill Dooley and played their home games at Kenan Memorial Stadium in Chapel Hill, North Carolina. They competed as members of the Atlantic Coast Conference, finishing in sixth.

Schedule

References

North Carolina
North Carolina Tar Heels football seasons
North Carolina Tar Heels football